"The Parting Glass" is a Scottish traditional song, often sung at the end of a gathering of friends. It has also long been sung in Ireland, enjoying considerable popularity to this day and strongly influencing the style in which it is often now sung. It was purportedly the most popular parting song sung in Scotland before Robert Burns wrote "Auld Lang Syne".

History

Referent

The "parting glass", or "stirrup cup", was the final hospitality offered to a departing guest. Once they had mounted, they were presented one final drink to fortify them for their travels. The custom was practised in several continental countries.

Text
The earliest known printed version was as a broadside in the 1770s and it first appeared in book form in Ancient and Modern Scottish Songs, Heroic Ballads, etc. by Herd. An early version is sometimes attributed to Sir Alex Boswell. The text is doubtless older than its 1770 appearance in broadside, as it was recorded in the Skene Manuscript, a collection of Scottish airs written at various dates between 1615 and 1635. It was known at least as early as 1605, when a portion of the first stanza was written in a farewell letter, as a poem now known as "Armstrong's Goodnight", by one of the Border Reivers executed that year for the murder in 1600 of Sir John Carmichael, Warden of the Scottish West March.

Exact lyrics vary between arrangements, but they include most, if not all, of the following stanzas appearing in different orders:

(The final verse is the first verse in the Scots version.)

Tune
The earliest known appearance of the tune today associated with this text is as a fiddle tune called "The Peacock", included in James Aird's A Selection of Scots, English, Irish and Foreign Airs in 1782.

Robert Burns referred to the air in 1786 as "Good night, and joy be wi' ye a'." when using it to accompany his Masonic lyric "The Farewell. To the brethren of St. James's Lodge, Tarbolton".

In 1800–1802, the song was incorrectly attributed to Joseph Haydn by Sigismund von Neukomm (1778-1858), who entered it in the Hoboken catalogue as "Good night and joy be wi' ye. Hob XXXIa 254. Mi mineur", which text has been wrongly attributed to Sir Alexander Boswell (1775-1822).

Patrick Weston Joyce, in his Old Irish Folk Music and Songs (1909), gives the tune with a different text under the name "Sweet Cootehill Town," noting, "The air seems to have been used indeed as a general farewell tune, so that—from the words of another song of the same class—it is often called 'Good night and joy be with you all.'" The celebrated Irish folk song collector Colm Ó Lochlainn has taken note of this identity of melodies between "The Parting Glass" and "Sweet Cootehill Town". "Sweet Cootehill Town" is another traditional farewell song, this time involving a man leaving Ireland to go to America.

The tune appeared, with sacred lyrics, in 19th century American tunebooks. "Shouting Hymn" in Jeremiah Ingalls's Christian Harmony (1805) is a related tune. The tune achieved wider currency among shape note singers with its publication, associated with a text first known in the 1814 Collection of Hymns and Spiritual Songs, "Come Now Ye Lovely Social Band", in William Walker's Southern Harmony (1835), and in The Sacred Harp (1844). This form of the song is still widely sung by Sacred Harp singers under the title "Clamanda".

Irish and North American influence
Dr Lori Watson, a lecturer in Scottish Ethnology at the University of Edinburgh states that it’s difficult to fully trace the origins of many traditional songs:

In regard to a modern version by Irish musician Hozier, Scottish singer-songwriter Karine Polwart notes:

Modern adaptations
"The Parting Glass" was re-introduced to mid-20th century audiences by the recordings and performances of The Clancy Brothers and Tommy Makem. Their rendition featured a solo vocal by youngest brother Liam and first appeared on their 1959 Tradition Records LP Come Fill Your Glass with Us as well as on a number of subsequent recordings, including the group's high-charting live performance album, In Person at Carnegie Hall. The rendition by the Clancys and Makem has been described as "by all accounts... the most influential" of the many recorded versions.

The song "Restless Farewell", written by Bob Dylan and featured on The Times They Are a-Changin' from 1964, uses the melody of the nineteenth century versions of "The Parting Glass" with Dylan's original lyrics. Dylan had learned the tune from the singing of the Clancys and Makem.

In 1998, the traditional words were set to a new, different melody (reminiscent of Mo Ghile Mear, another Irish traditional song) by Irish composer Shaun Davey. In 2002, he orchestrated this version for orchestra, choir, pipes, fiddle, and percussion to commemorate the opening of the Helix Concert Hall, Dublin, Ireland. His version appears in the film Waking Ned Devine.

Film, TV and other media appearances

The song features prominently at the end of the movie Waking Ned Devine when friends of the deceased title character share a toast to him after his death.

Actor Pierce Brosnan performed a version of this song in the 2002 movie Evelyn.

Actresses Emily Kinney and Lauren Cohan performed a rendition of this song in the season three premiere episode "Seed" of The Walking Dead. It also appears on the soundtrack, The Walking Dead: Original Soundtrack – Vol. 1.

It was sung by Anne Bonny (played by Sarah Greene) at the ending of the video game Assassin's Creed IV: Black Flag.

It was sung by The Wailin' Jennys in the film Wildlike.

It was sung in the TV series Cranford by Joe McFadden in 2007.

At the request of Margaret Atwood, to end her guest-edited edition of BBC Radio 4's Today programme with the song, a version by singer Karine Polwart and pianist Dave Milligan was commissioned.

Notable recordings

References

Songs about parting
Ed Sheeran songs
Irish folk songs
Scottish folk songs
The Dubliners songs
The Pogues songs
Year of song unknown
Drinking songs